Deakin Reserve is a cricket ground in Shepparton, Victoria, Australia.  The first recorded match held on the ground came in 1962 when Victoria Country played the Marylebone Cricket Club.  A Youth Test match was held in December 1986 when Australia Under-19s played Indian Under-19s.  A Youth One Day International was later held there in November 1997 when Australia Under-19s played Pakistan Under-19s.  A List A match was held there in the 2006–07 Ford Ranger Cup between Victoria and Western Australia.

Australian Rules Football and netball are also played at the ground.

References

External links
Deakin Reserve at ESPNcricinfo
Deakin Reserve at CricketArchive

Cricket grounds in Australia
Sports venues in Victoria (Australia)
1962 establishments in Australia
Sports venues completed in 1962